Punjab Institute of Medical Sciences (PIMS Jalandhar) is a medical college and medical research institute based in Jalandhar, India.

Location and function
Situated in the heart of Jalandhar with an area spread of more than 55 acres, Punjab Institute of Medical Sciences (PIMS), Jalandhar was envisaged by the Govt. Of Punjab (GoP) in 1999 as the first medical college cum teaching hospital in Doaba region. PIMS was conceptualized under Public Private Partnership (PPP) mode by PIMS Society, PIMS Medical and Education Charitable Society, Department of Medical Education & Research and GoP to be a tertiary care teaching hospital. The medical college is affiliated to Baba Farid University of Health Sciences. Presently the premier institute is doing exceptionally well under the administration of Resident Director Mr. Amit Singh and Director Principal Dr. Rajiv Arora and has a total of 6 M.B.B.S. batches including interns with a strength of more than 750 budding doctors. Punjab Institute of Medical Sciences has an intake of 150 students in every batch annually which makes it one of the most sought after medical college of Doaba region in Punjab.

Departments
The hospital has many clinical departments including medicine, general surgery, orthopedics, gynecology and obstetrics, pediatrics, ophthalmology, dermatology and venerology, psychiatry, dentistry, physiotherapy, nephrology, urology, plastic and reconstructive surgery, medical oncology, ENT, chest and TB. The O.P.D. charges are based on P.G.I. norms. The hospital also has pathological, biochemical and microbiological including COVID-19 RT-PCR and Rapid Antigen Testing (RAT) diagnostic facilities with highly specialized laboratories and imaging techniques including X-Ray, Ultrasound and CT scan. The institute has a blood bank, dialysis unit, COVID-19 treatment facility  and round the clock emergency services. Functioning of Anti-Retroviral Therapy (ART) centre was allowed in PIMS premises Under National AIDS Control Programme (NACP).

Charitable work
PIMS also works to serve the society through various charitable endeavors like organizing medical camps and check-ups in areas deprived of medical facilities and has adopted 15 villages in the surrounding area of the city, in which medical camps are organized on regular basis. President of India on 26-June-2018 confers the National Award-2018 to Punjab Institute of Medical Sciences (PIMS), Jalandhar in the category of ‘Best Educational Institution’ for recognition of its outstanding and exemplary services in the field of Prevention of Alcoholism and Substance (Drug) Abuse in the state of Punjab. PIMS de-addiction OPD caters to an average of 350 cases per month. In order to reach out to larger population, Department of Psychiatry and Department of Community Medicine, PIMS jointly started a campaign- ‘Nasha Mukti Abhiyan’ in 2015 wherein 15 villages in the vicinity of Jalandhar were adopted with an aim to make their village drug free. Under this campaign, free medical check-ups were provided along with psychiatric counseling, Health Talks were delivered in community and schools on topics like Types of Illicit Drugs, Harmful Effects of Drugs on Health, Family and Community, Methods of Prevention and Knowledge regarding Referral Centres etc. 57 Nukkad Nataks were organized for sensitizing the public about the drug abuse, performed by PIMS MBBS students. The intent of the campaign was to decrease the overall level of substance abuse in the concerned villages and increase the awareness regarding harmful effects of substance abuse.

Education
The college building consists of classrooms, lecture theatres, labs, museums, a grand central library and a computer centre and has many non clinical departments like anatomy, physiology, pharmacology, community medicine, forensic medicine etc. The college is now offering 4 B.Sc. paramedical courses also. PIMS organized various CMEs and conferences including TRANSCON 2019, the 44th national conference of ISBTI, on its campus. Recently medical college hosted its first convocation ceremony in which 118 MBBS pass-outs from 2014 to 2015 batch were awarded degrees. The chief guest on the occasion was Dr Raj Bahadur, Vice-Chancellor of Baba Farid University.

See also
 Baba Farid University of Health Sciences
 PGIMER Chandigarh
 List of medical colleges in India

References

External links 
Punjab Institute of Medical Sciences
Punjab Institute of Medical Sciences
PIMS on MCI Official site

Medical Council of India
Regional Cancer Centres in India
Medical research institutes in India
Medical colleges in Punjab, India
Jalandhar
Educational institutions established in 1999
Hospitals established in 1999
Research institutes in Punjab, India
1999 establishments in Punjab, India